Brecht is both a surname and a masculine given name. Notable people with the name include:

Surname:
Arnold Brecht (1884–1977), German jurist and government official
Bertolt Brecht (1898–1956), German poet, playwright, and theatre director
Eberhard Brecht (born 1950), German politician
Eugen Brecht (1912–1944), German military officer
George Brecht (1926–2008), American chemist and artist
Jürgen Brecht (born 1940), German fencer
Kurt Brecht (born 1961), American singer and writer
Leo Brecht (born 1962), German organizational theorist, consultant and professor
Martin Brecht (born 1932), German academic and biographer
Stefan Brecht (1924–2009), German-born American poet and scholar of theater

Given name:
Brecht Capon (born 1988), Belgian footballer
Brecht Dejaegere (born 1991), Belgian footballer
Brecht Rodenburg (born 1967), Dutch volleyball player
Brecht Verbrugghe (born 1982), Belgian footballer
Brecht Wallis (born 1977), Belgian kickboxer

Surnames from given names
German-language surnames
Masculine given names